Nørre Lyndelse is a village on the Danish island of Funen. It is located in Faaborg-Midtfyn Municipality,  Region of Southern Denmark and has a population of 2,161 (1 January 2022).

The danish composer Carl Nielsen was born and raised in Sortelung near Nørre Lyndelse and his childhood home is now a museum.

References

Villages in Denmark
Faaborg-Midtfyn Municipality